Henry Parker Willis (August 14, 1874 – July 18, 1937) was an American financial expert.

Biography
He was born at Weymouth, Massachusetts, the son of the Universalist minister and suffragist Olympia Brown. He graduated from the University of Chicago with a Ph.D. in 1897 and was a member of Alpha Kappa Psi professional business fraternity.

Willis taught economics and political science at Washington and Lee University. He was professor of economics at George Washington University and lectured at Columbia University, becoming a professor of economics there in 1919.

He served as an expert to the Ways and Means and Banking and Currency committees of the United States House of Representatives, and in other positions. Willis was the first Secretary of the Federal Reserve Board, serving between 1914 and 1918.

Willis was also the first president of the Philippine National Bank. In 1926, he was appointed the chairman of the Commission of Inquiry into Banking and the Issue of Notes, a committee established by the government of the Irish Free State to determine what changes were necessary in relation to banking and banknote issue, which recommended the creation of a new currency for the state.

Writings

 
 Reciprocity (1903), with J. L. Laughlin
 Our Philippine Problem (1905)
 Principles and Problems of Modern Banking (1910)
 Life of Stephen A. Douglas (1911)
 
 American Banking (1916)

References

External links
 

1874 births
1937 deaths
American economics writers
American male non-fiction writers
Columbia University faculty
George Washington University faculty
People from Weymouth, Massachusetts
University of Chicago alumni
Washington and Lee University faculty
Coolidge family
Economists from Massachusetts